Sandal is a town in Afghanistan. It has a population of about 2,700.

See also
 Samangan Province

References

Populated places in Samangan Province